Waters Park, Texas (also known as Waters and Watters) was a village located eight miles north of downtown Austin, Texas defined by the boundaries of Farm Road 1325, MoPac, and the Southern Pacific Railroad. It is now part of the City of Austin.

Name 
The village was originally known as Summers' Grove, and the origin of the name Waters Park is unknown.

History 
The land at Waters Park was originally owned by Silas and Parthenia Summers who purchased the land in 1872. Right-of-way was sold to Austin and Northwestern Railroad in October 1881. The railroad built a park with a swimming pool, gazebo, baseball field, picnic grounds, and concessions stands in the summer of 1882. The area's railroad tracks were used to transport pink granite from Granite Mountain to the Texas State Capitol in Downtown Austin. Due to a bend in the tracks, trains would occasionally derail, accidentally dumping some of the pink granite. The rocks which remain are a local point of interest. The local post office opened in 1883 and closed in 1905.
The town was a popular vacation spot as it was easy to access via train from Austin. An advert in the June 14, 1882 edition of the Austin Daily Democratic Statesman read: 

The town proved historically to be Austin's fourth most popular day trip destination after the Austin Dam, Seiders Springs, and the then existent lake at Hyde Park.

See also 
 Austin, Texas
 Round Rock, Texas
 Georgetown, Texas
 History of Austin, Texas
 Texas State Capitol

References 

Geography of Austin, Texas
History of Austin, Texas